Vincent Cannistraro was Director of Intelligence Programs for the United States National Security Council (NSC) from 1984 to 1987; Special assistant for Intelligence in the Office of the Secretary of Defense until 1988; and Chief of Operations and Analysis at the Central Intelligence Agency's (CIA) Counterterrorist Center until 1991.

Before 1984, he was an officer with the CIA's Directorate of Operations in the Middle East, Africa, Europe, and Central America.

After leaving the CIA in 1991, Cannistraro worked as a consultant on terrorism and security issues for a number of corporate and government clients, including ABC News and The Vatican.

He died on May 21, 2019.

Education and awards
Cannistaro has a B.A. and M.A. from Boston College. In 1989, he received the Secretary of Defense's Award for Meritorious Civilian Service. He has also received the CIA Medal for Distinguished Service.

Professional life
While at the CIA, Cannistraro ran the agency's Central American task force that supervised covert action in the region, including the Nicaraguan Contras (both the left wing guerillas in the South and the right wing contras in the North). He moved to the Reagan NSC by the direction of CIA Latin American Chief Duane Clarridge, who supported Col. Oliver North. The Contra program was transferred in 1984 by President Ronald Reagan to the NSC, and Cannistraro was made Director of Intelligence there later that year. As director, he was responsible for monitoring the US intelligence community budget. and coordinating the approval process for covert action. He also chaired the Afghanistan Working Group at the White House.

In 1988, Cannistraro became Chief of Operations and Analysis at the CIA's Counterterrorism Center, where he led the agency's investigation into the 1988 bombing of Pan Am Flight 103 over Lockerbie.

Cannistraro also alleged that Iraqi intelligence agent Farouk Hijazi had invited bin Laden to live in Iraq during a December 1998 meeting in Afghanistan, though he maintained that bin Laden refused the invitation and did not accept support from Saddam Hussein.

He reported on the forged Niger "yellowcake" uranium documents as an attempt by some Bush Administration supporters to link Iraq with nuclear weapons development in order to increase public support for the Iraq war), and on the related disclosure of the identity of CIA case officer Valerie Plame.

The front company, Brewster Jennings & Associates, apparently also was used by other CIA officers whose work now could be at risk, according to Cannistraro.

Cannistaro runs IntelligenceBrief, a security and information service for private clients. The Vatican is one such client.

On September 12, 2001, Cannistraro stated that five of the hijackers had entered the United States in Maine from Canada via Yarmouth, Nova Scotia, and/or a remote border point near Jackman, Maine, several hundred kilometres southeast of Quebec City.

Notes

References
"Interview with Vincent Cannistraro", PBS Frontline.
"Witness biographies" (pdf), Senate Democratic Policy Committee Hearing, October 24, 2003.
"About Vincent Cannistraro", Intelligence Brief, Cannistraro's security and information service.
Diamond, John. "CIA cuts off more than 1,000 informants, many for criminality", Associated Press, March 2, 1997.
Ignatius, David. "Tale of Two White House Aides: Confidence and Motivation; North Viewed as a Can-Do Marine Who Went Too Far in Zealousness." The Washington Post. November 30, (1986): Sec. A1.
Kornbluh, P., and M. Byrne. "The Iran-Contra Scandal: The declassified history." New York: The New Press. (1993): xviii.
Priest, Dana. "The Slowly Changing Face of the CIA Spy; Recruits Eager to Fight Terror Are Flooding In, but Few Look the Part," The Washington Post, August 9, 2002.
Santos, Lori. "Walsh draws testimony from NSC officials." United Press International, June 15, (1987)

People of the Central Intelligence Agency
Iran–Contra affair
2019 deaths
Year of birth missing
Experts on terrorism